Grewia retusifolia is a shrub species in the family Malvaceae. Common names include dysentery bush, emu-berry, dog's balls, turkey bush and diddle diddle. It is widespread in tropical and subtropical areas of Eastern Australia and Northern Western Australia. The species produces small, sweet, two-lobed fruit with a fibrous acidic pulp surrounding the seeds. Leichhardt described the fruits as having a very agreeable taste, which could be boiled to make a refreshing drink. Indigenous Australians use the bark and leaves in medications. The crushed leaves were used as a poultice to relieve toothaches.

References

retusifolia
Malvales of Australia
Flora of the Northern Territory
Flora of Queensland
Rosids of Western Australia